is a Japanese actor and writer. He also worked as a narrator for many documentaries, both on television and film. He is best known for his roles in Visitor Q (2001), Crows Zero (2007), Crows Zero 2 (2009), and The Raid 2: Berandal (2014). 
He is also known for his yakuza roles, such as Joji Yazaki, the head of Soshu Family Syndicate and the main antagonist of Crows Zero and Crows Zero 2, and Hideaki Goto, the head of Goto Family, a powerful yakuza family from Japan and one of two mob bosses that control Jakarta in The Raid 2: Berandal.

Appearances

Films
 Violent Cop (1989)
 All Under the Moon (1993)
 Spellbound (1999)
 Dead or Alive 2: Birds (2000), Kōhei
 Tomie: Replay (2000), Dr. Tachibana
 Family (2001)
 Agitator (2001)
 Visitor Q (2001), Kiyoshi Yamasaki
 The Guys from Paradise (2001), Toshiyuki Umino
 Deadly Outlaw: Rekka (2002)
 Sabu (2002), Giichi
 Kikoku (2003), Sorimachi
 The Man in White (2003), Niimi
 Tokusou Sentai Dekaranger The Movie: Full Blast Action (2004), Algolian Volger
 Nobody Knows (2004), Kyōbashi
 The Great Yokai War (2005), Oh Tengu
 Cromartie High - The Movie (2005), Pootan
 Azumi 2 (2005), Kinkaku
 Origin: Spirits of the Past (2006), Shunack
 Big Bang Love, Juvenile A (2006), assistant police inspector
 Nihon Chinbotsu (2006), Shinichirō Nakata
 Memories of Tomorrow (2006), Hasegawa
 The Sword of Alexander (2007), Gonzō
 Like a Dragon (2007), Imanishi
 Crows Zero (2007), Jōji Yazaki
 Happy Ever After (2007)
 SS (2008), Kurihara
 Climber's High (2008)
 20th Century Boys 1: Beginning of the End (2008)
 20th Century Boys 3: Redemption (2009)
 Crows Zero 2 (2009), Jōji Yazaki
 Railways (2010), Yoshiki Kawahira
 The Raid 2 (2014), Hideaki Gotō
 The Mole Song: Undercover Agent Reiji (2014)
 Kiyamachi Daruma (2015), Shigeo Katsuura
 Galaxy Turnpike (2015)
 The Mole Song: Hong Kong Capriccio (2016)
 Usagi Oishi (2016), Katsusaburō Yamagiwa
 Mixed Doubles (2017), Motonobu Ochiai
 Mary and the Witch's Flower (2017), Zebedee
 Out and Out (2018)
 Come Kiss Me at 0:00 AM (2019)
 Sumodo (2020), narrator
 The Supporting Actors: The Movie (2021), himself
 The Great Yokai War: Guardians (2021), Yadōkai
 Jigoku no Hanazono: Office Royale (2021)
 The Mole Song: Final (2021)
 Radiation House: The Movie (2022), Toshio Onodera

TV dramas
 Battle Fever J (1979), Yoshio Murano
 Taiyō ni Hoero! (1986) episode.718(Final episode) 
 Special Rescue Exceedraft (1992), Seiji Nagai
 Tokusou Robo Janperson (1993), Doctor Saionji
 Ninja Sentai Kakuranger (1994), Prince Junior
 Hōjō Tokimune (2001), Miura Mitsumura
 Kōshōnin (2003)
 Lion-Maru G (2006), Junior
 Fumō Chitai (2009)
 Teppan (2010–2011), Jō Murakami
 Taira no Kiyomori (2012), Hōjō Tokimasa
 Doctor-X: Surgeon Michiko Daimon (2013-2019), Takashi Ebina
 Andō Lloyd: A.I. knows Love? (2013), Isaku Ashimo
 Border: Keishichô Sôsa Ikka Satsujinhan Sôsa Dai 4-gakkari (2014)
 Yamegoku: Yakuza Yamete Itadakimasu (2015), Isao Tachibana
 Dr.Rintarō (2015), Shigeto Araki
 Wise and Foolish (2015), Taizan Mutō
 Sanada Maru (2016), Uesugi Kagekatsu
 Montage (2016), Jirō Sekiguchi
 The Supporting Actors (2017), himself
 Warotenka (2017), Gihei Fujioka
 The Supporting Actors 2 (2018), himself
 Magic x Warrior Magimajo Pures! (2018), Jama Danshaku
 Kuroido Goroshi (2018), Rokusuke Kuroido
 Segodon (2018), Katsu Kaishū
 Radiation House (2019–2021), Toshio Onodera
 Talio (2020)
 The Supporting Actors 3 (2021), himself
 Shimura Ken to Drif no Daibakushō Monogatari (2021), Chosuke Ikariya
 Don't Call It Mystery (2022), Kanzō Yabu

Video games
 Onimusha 3 (2005) - Gargant (Japanese voice)
 Shin Onimusha: Dawn of Dreams (2006) - Gargant (Japanese voice)
 Yakuza 4 (2010) - Junji Sugiuchi (voice and likeness)
 Binary Domain (2012) - Officer Phillips (Japanese voice)
 Let It Die (2017) - Narration (Japanese voice)

Japanese dubbing
 Guardians of the Galaxy (2014), Groot
 Guardians of the Galaxy Vol. 2 (2017), Groot
 Avengers: Infinity War (2018), Groot
 Ralph Breaks the Internet (2018), Groot
 Avengers: Endgame (2019), Groot
 Thor: Love and Thunder (2022), Groot
 The Guardians of the Galaxy Holiday Special (2022), Groot
 Guardians of the Galaxy Vol. 3 (2023), Groot

Awards
2009International Drama Festival in Tokyo'' – Best Supporting Actor

References

External links
 
EN's tower 

Living people
1961 births
Male actors from Tokyo
Japanese male film actors
Japanese male television actors
Japanese male video game actors
Japanese male voice actors
20th-century Japanese male actors
21st-century Japanese male actors
People from Shinagawa